The Irish in America: Long Journey Home is a 6-hour miniseries about the Irish Americans. It has been filmed in Ireland and New York City and distributed by Walt Disney.

The soundtrack, by Paddy Moloney of The Chieftains and Elvis Costello won the Grammy Award for Best Traditional Folk Album in 1999. It was broadcast on PBS in 1998.

References

1990s American television miniseries

Works about Irish-American culture